Coenosia atrata is a species of fly in the family Muscidae.

References

Further reading

External links

 Diptera.info

Muscidae
Insects described in 1853